The 1931 Australian Championships was a tennis tournament that took place on outdoor Grass courts at the White City Tennis Club, Sydney, Australia from 27 February to 9 March. It was the 24th edition of the Australian Championships (now known as the Australian Open), the 6th held in Sydney, and the first Grand Slam tournament of the year. The singles titles were won by Australians Jack Crawford and Coral McInnes Buttsworth.

Finals

Men's singles

 Jack Crawford defeated  Harry Hopman  6–4, 6–2, 2–6, 6–1

Women's singles

 Coral McInnes Buttsworth defeated  Marjorie Cox Crawford  1–6, 6–3, 6–4

Men's doubles

 Charles Donohoe /  Ray Dunlop defeated  Jack Crawford /  Harry Hopman 8–6, 6–2, 5–7, 7–9, 6–4

Women's doubles

 Daphne Akhurst Cozens /  Louie Bickerton defeated  Nell Lloyd /  Gwen Utz 6–0, 6–4

Mixed doubles

 Marjorie Cox Crawford /  Jack Crawford defeated  Emily Hood Westacott /  Aubrey Willard 7–5, 6–4

References

External links
 Australian Open official website

1931 in Australian tennis
1931
February 1931 sports events
March 1931 sports events